Pizhaku is a village in Kottayam District in the Indian state of Kerala. It is located on the Pala–Thodupuzha state highway.

It is a village with plenty of rubber plantations and agriculture.

Geography
The area is covered with mountains, plains, trees. The main eastern highway passes through the heart of Pizhaku.

Educational institutions
There are two schools in Pizhaku:
 Nirmala Public School, Pizhaku
 St. Joseph's High school, Manathoor, Pizhaku

Attractions
The Pampanal Waterfall at Manathoor is the major attraction of Pizhaku. Vyakula Sanketham, the rubber factory, churches, and temples are other attractions.

Facilities and Development 
Compared to other villages in Kerala, Pizhaku is well developed with all basic amenities. Several are described below.

Post Office 
The post office of Pizhaku is also located at Ramapuram Kavala Junction with Speed Post Facility. Pincode: 686651

Banks 
State Bank of Travancore has a branch at Pizhaku located at Ramapuram Kavala Junction.

Co-Operative Bank (Kadanad Service Co-operative Bank) 
In 1979, KSCB (The Kadanad Service Co-operative Bank Ltd. K2) opened its first branch in Manathoor Church Junction, Pizhaku.

Education and Schools 
Nirmala Public School at Pizhaku  and St. Joseph's School (Kerala State Syllabus) at Manathoor, Pizhaku satisfies the educational needs of this area.

Nursery Schools are there at Ramapuram Kavala and Manathoor.

Accessibility and Transportation 
Majority of Roads at Pizhaku is well paved and in Good Condition. The SH 8, Pala-Thodupuzha Highway Passes through the centre of this place. All the 4 main junctions at Pizhaku are accessible through this highway. i.e. Manathoor School Jn., Manathoor Church Jn., Pizhaku Palam Jn., Ramapuram Kavala Jn.
Ramapuram-Pizhaku Road
Manathoor-Karimkunnam Shortcut Road
Pizhaku-Kadanad Road
Manathoor-Cherukurinji Road 
These are the other important roads at Pizhaku.

Pizhaku is blessed with plenty buses services. Plenty of Private buses plying between Pala and Thodupuzha are found within an interval of 10 minutes. Moreover, Thodupuzha-Pala-Kottayam Chain KSRTC buses are available with an interval of 15 minutes. Long trip buses are also available to major destinations in South Kerala and Malabar. Thodupuzha - Thiruvananthapuram buses are available through this route. To northern side Nilambur, Mananthavady, Sulthan Bathery, Kozhikode, Thiruvambady, Kasargod, Kannur, Palakkad Thrissur, Aluva-Mala, Wayanad, Idukki, Adimali buses are available. Interstate services such as Bangalore and Coimbatore are also available. 
The major bus stops are:
Manathoor School Junction (LS FP)
Manathoor Church Junction
Pizhaku Palam (LS FP) - Fair Stage for Ordinary Buses.
Ramapuram Kavala Pizhaku

By Rail: Kottayam is the nearest railway station (45 km) . Ernakulam is also close. (65 km)
By Air: Cochin International Airport - 70 km

Medical Care 
A Homeo Clinic is available at Pizhaku - Near Manathoor Church.
Few Doctors Practice privately at Manathoor-Pizhaku.

Communication & Others 
Almost all houses have Landphone connection. This area has good service for BSNL, Idea, Vodafone and Jio.
BSNL and Cable TV provides Internet connection.
Almost all houses has got electricity connection from KSEB.
Many local shops - grocery, stationery, butcher, bakery, studio are available.
JaiHind Library is the main public Library at Pizhaku. 
Volley Ball Courts and Badminton Courts are available at Pizhaku.
About 4 hotels are available at Pizhaku.

Demography and religion
Altogether Pizhaku has a population of 4000. Majority of them are Syro Malabar Catholics. Hindus and Christians are living together in religious harmony.

The Pizhaku Thrikkayil temple is very ancient. There was Palace associated with the temple. This is near to Manathoor School Junction. SNDP temple was newly constructed and dedicated to Sri Narayana Guru.

The Syro Malabar Catholics have two Parishes - Manathoor and Urumbukavu. Both are under Kadanad Forane (earlier Ramapuram forane) in Palai Diocese. They are Syrian Catholics of many ancient families can be found here.

Before 1910 Pizhaku was under the parish of Kadanad. In 1910 St. Mary's Church Manathoor at Pizhaku is established to help the Catholic migrants in Pizhaku area as it was difficult for them to attend church services at Kadanad church, which was 4 km away. It became an independent Parish in October 1928 and Fr. Thomas Parekunnel was appointed as first parish priest. There are around 2000 faithful from 410 families.

St. John the Baptist Church is situated at Ramapuram Kavala. Though this church is commonly known as Makkalpally (Makkal church), the name of this church is mentioned as ‘Urumbukavu pally’ in the records. Urumbukavu church, which remained as the Kurisupally of Ramapuram Forane church, became a parish church since 1 February 1954 as per the circular No. 112, issued on 26 January 1954 by the Bishop of Pala Mar Sebastian Vayalil. There are around 220 families with 1050 faithful.

Main Centres:
 St. Mary's Church Manathoor 
 St. John the Baptist Church Urumpukavu 
 Pizhaku Thrikkayil SreeKrishna Swami Temple
 SNDP temple
 Nirmala Public School
 St. Joseph's High School
 Kadanad Co-op Bank
 SBT 
Convents:
Congregation of Jesus Convent (Mary Ward Convent)
Sacred Heart Convent
Carmillite convent

Political map

The Pizhaku Comes under the Pala Legislative Aseembly Constituency and Kottayam Parliamentary Constituency. Kadanad Panchayath has two wards here namely Pizhaku and Manathoor. Pizhaku Borders Kurinji on North, Kadanad-Velyath-Mattathipara on East, Aincombu on South and Ramapuram on west. The Idukki district border is about 4 km.
The Lalam Thodu and Karikila Thodu flows through this land.

References 

Villages in Kottayam district